S. P. Sarguna Pandian (c. 1941 – 13 August 2016) was an Indian politician who was the deputy General Secretary of Dravida Munnetra Kazhagam (DMK) in Tamil Nadu. She was also Social Welfare Minister in the assembly formed after the 1996 election.

She was elected to the Tamil Nadu legislative assembly from Dr. Radhakrishnan Nagar constituency as a DMK candidate in the 1989 and 1996 elections. She died on 13 August 2016.

References 

Dravida Munnetra Kazhagam politicians
State cabinet ministers of Tamil Nadu
2016 deaths
20th-century Indian women politicians
20th-century Indian politicians
Tamil Nadu MLAs 1996–2001
Year of birth uncertain
Women members of the Tamil Nadu Legislative Assembly